Beneckeia is a genus of Lower to Middle Triassic ammonites included in the ceratitid family Beneckeiidae found e.g. in Germany, Poland, and Israel. Beneckeia shells are compressed smooth oxycones, involute with sharp venters. Sutures are multilobed with small adventitious lobes.

References 

 Arkell, W.J, et al, 1957. Treatise on Invertebrate Paleontology Part L Mollusca 4; Geological Society of America and University of Kansas Press. 
 Beneckeia Paleobiology Database 14 Mar 2013.

Triassic ammonites
Ceratitida genera
Ammonites of Europe
Early Triassic genus first appearances
Middle Triassic genus extinctions